Mkhululi Siqula (born 4 December 1991) professionally known as Heavy-K, is a South African DJ and music producer. Born and raised in Veeplaas, Port Elizabeth,   Siqula relocated to Johannesburg at the age of 21 to purse his  musical career.

Early life 
Mkhululi Siqula was born on December 4, 1991, Veeplaas, Port Elizabeth. His father, Phindlie Siqula, was working as a mechanic. Siqula attended Mzimhlophe Public primary school and Ndzondelelo Secondary School.

Career
In 2007, he produced "Lento" Professor's single at  the age of 16.
In 2013, he moved to Johannesburg to purse  his career in music. His debut studio  album Respect the Drumboss 2013 was released  on  January 1, 2013. In 2014, he produced Bucie's single "Easy to Love" which peaked number 9 on Entertainment Monitoring Africa.

In September 2015, his single "Umoya" featuring Professor and Mpumi was released. "Moya" was nominated for Best Collaboration  and Best Dance Album for Respect the Drumboss 2015 at 15th Annual Metro FM Awards. 
 
On December 2, 2016, his third studio album 1950 was released in South Africa. In August 2017, his single "Inde" featuring Bucie and Nokwazi was released. The song was certified 6× platinum.

In early 2018, his single "Sphum’ elokshini" featuring South African vocalist Mondli Ngcobo was released. On October 5, 2018, his fourth studio album Respect the Drumboss 2018 was released.

2019-2021: Khusta, Respect the Drumboss 21(10 Years edition)
In July 2020, his single  "Uyeke"  featuring Natalia Mabaso was released. The song was certified platinum by the Recording Industry of South Africa with sales of 50 000 units. On July 31, 2020, his fifth studio album Khusta was released.

In November 2021, he announced his  remix of Shivers in collaboration  with Ed Sheeran, which was  released on November 12.

Mkhululi was reportedly working on his sixth studio album by February  2021. On December 3, 2021, his sixth  studio album Respect the Drumboss 21 (10 Years edition) was released. It features Just Bheki, Simmy, Aymos, Nkosazana Daughter, Natalia Mabaso, Intaba Yase Dubai, Sino Msolo, Boohle, MSK, Bassie, Ntunja, Drumetic Boyz, and MalumNator.

2022-present: New projects 

In early November 2022, he announced working on his upcoming The Underrated King EP and released its lead single "Ama Miliyoni" featuring Meez and Professor on November 18,2022.

Personal life
In 2014, Siqula met Ntombi in a club at Grahamstown. The two got married and had two children together. In 2019, the couple got a divorce.

References

External links 
 

Living people
1991 births
People from Port Elizabeth
South African DJs
South African record producers